Losar ("new year") also known as Tibetan New Year, is a festival in Tibetan Buddhism. The holiday is celebrated on various dates depending on location (Tibet, Bhutan, Nepal, India) tradition. The holiday is a new year's festival, celebrated on the first day of the lunisolar Tibetan calendar, which corresponds to a date in February or March in the Gregorian calendar. In 2020,
the new year commenced on the 24th of February and celebrations ran until the 26th of the same month. It also commenced the Year of the Male Iron Rat.

The variation of the festival in Nepal is called Lhochhar and is observed about eight weeks earlier than the Tibetan Losar.

History

Losar predates the arrival of Buddhism in Tibet and has its roots in a winter incense-burning custom of the Bon religion. During the reign of the ninth Tibetan king, Pude Gungyal (317-398), it is said that this custom merged with a harvest festival to form the annual Losar festival.

The 14th Dalai Lama (1998: p. 233) frames the importance of consulting the Nechung Oracle for Losar:

Tenzin Wangyal (2002: p.xvii) frames his experience of Tibetan cultural practice of Losar in relation to elemental celebrations and offerings to Nāga (Tibetan: Klu):

Practice
Losar is celebrated for 15 days, with the main celebrations on the first three days.  On the first day of Losar, a beverage called changkol is made from chhaang (a Tibetan-Nepali cousin of beer).  The second day of Losar is known as King's Losar (gyalpo losar).  Losar is traditionally preceded by the five-day practice of Vajrakilaya.  Because the Uyghurs adopted the Chinese calendar, and the Mongols and Tibetans adopted the Uyghur calendar, Losar occurs near or on the same day as the Chinese New Year and the Mongolian New Year, but the traditions of Losar are unique to Tibet, and predate both Indian and Chinese influences.

As well as that, the Sherpas are associated with Losar and enjoy Losar in the high altitudes of the Nepal Himalayan Range. Prior to the Chinese invasion of Tibet in 1950, Losar began with a morning ritual ceremony at Namgyal Monastery, led by the Dalai Lama and other high-ranking lamas, with government officials participating, to honor the Dharmapala (dharma-protector) Palden Lhamo. After the Dalai Lama was exiled, many monasteries were destroyed and monks imprisoned. Since that time, Tibetan Buddhist practice in Tibet has been difficult to observe publicly.

Losar forms part of the culture of Ladakh for Buddhists residing in that region.

In Tibet, various customs are associated with the holiday:

Losar customs in Bhutan are similar to, but distinct from, customs in neighboring Tibet. Modern celebration of the holiday began in Bhutan in 1637, when Shabdrung Ngawang Namgyal commemorated the completion of the Punakha Dzong with an inaugural ceremony, in which "Bhutanese came from all over the country to bring offerings of produce from their various regions, a tradition that is still reflected in the wide variety of foods consumed during the ritual Losar meals." Traditional foods consumed on the occasion include sugarcane and green bananas, which are  considered auspicious. In Bhutan, picnicking, dancing, singing, dart-playing, archery (see archery in Bhutan), and the giving of offerings are all traditions.

Dates
The Tibetan calendar is a lunisolar calendar.  Losar is celebrated on the first through third days of the first lunar month.

 * Note: Rabjung (Wylie: rab byung) is the name of the 60-year cycle of the Tibetan calendar that started in 1027 CE, and is currently in its 17th cycle.
 ** Note: These year names have more than one translation into English with different terms used by different groups. 
 *** Note: Losar is celebrated by some international communities at more or less the same time it is celebrated in Asia. For example, for a year when Losar starts on February 1 in Asia time zones, it may be celebrated by some in United States time zones on January 31. Losar celebrations are normally for three days.

See also
 Galdan Namchot
 Losoong Festival
 Lunar New Year
 Nepali calendar
 Tibetan astrology
 Tibetan calendar
 Lunar New Year: Celebrations of Lunar New Year in other parts of Asia
 South and Southeast Asian solar New Year: Similar Asian Lunisolar New Year celebrations that occur in April:

References

Nepalese culture
Bhutanese culture
Public holidays in Nepal
Public holidays in Bhutan
New Year celebrations
Tibetan festivals
Religious festivals in Nepal
January observances
February observances
Tibetan Buddhist festivals
March observances
Observances set by the Tibetan calendar
Religious festivals in Tibet
Religious festivals in India
Festivals in Nepal
Festivals in Bhutan
Observances held on the new moon